The Autovía AC-15 or Autovía de Acceso al Puerto Exterior de La Coruña is a Spanish autovía located in the province of A Coruña, Galicia. It connects the Autopista AG-55 with A Coruña External Port, and has a length of 6.5 km.

The autovía was opened in June 2016, and its construction had a cost of €83.6 million. It is administrated by the Government of Spain.

Autopistas and autovías in Spain
Transport in Galicia (Spain)